Polish Nonpartisan Organization was a political movement of nonpartisan politicians, that operated in the Republic of Central Lithuania. It was part of the Association of National Parties and Organizations, which, following the 1922 general elections, holt 43 seats in the Sejm of Central Lithuania. It was represented by Wiktor Czarnowski.

Citations

Notes

References 

Political parties in the Republic of Central Lithuania
Political parties disestablished in 1922